The 2012 Vissel Kobe season is Vissel Kobe's sixth consecutive season and 15th overall in J. League Division 1. Vissel Kobe are also competing in the 2012 Emperor's Cup and 2012 J. League Cup.

As of 2011, Kobe is the only top division club to never win any major honour (their promotions have always been as runners-up or below, and they have never won the Emperor's Cup, J. League Cup or Shakaijin Cup).

Players

Competitions

J. League

League table

Matches

J. League Cup

Emperor's Cup

References

Vissel Kobe
Vissel Kobe seasons